The Astarachay, is a small river that  defines the eastern border between Iran and Azerbaijan in Western Asia.

It is a tributary of the Caspian Sea. After flowing in a canyon through the Alborz mountain range, it reaches its river mouth on the southwestern Caspian coast.

It is partially in Gilan Province of far northwestern Iran.

See also

External links
Aerial Map: Astarachay
Astarachay

References

Rivers of Gilan Province
Rivers of Azerbaijan
International rivers of Asia
Tributaries of the Caspian Sea
Alborz (mountain range)
Landforms of Gilan Province
Astara District
Azerbaijan–Iran border
Border rivers